The Nigerian National Assembly delegation from Oyo comprises three Senators representing Oyo South, Oyo Central, and Oyo North. It has fourteen Representatives representing the following federal constituencies: Ona-Ara/Egbeda; Iseyin/Kajola/Iwajowa/Itesiwaju; Ibadan North- East/South- East; Lagelu/Akinyele; Ibarapa East/Ido; Ibadan North, Oluyole; Atisbo/Saki East/Saki West; Ibadan North West/South West; Ibarapa Central/Ibarapa North; Afijio/Atiba/Oyo East/Oyo West; Ogo-oluwa/Surulere Oluyole; Ogbomosho-North/South/Orire; and Olurunssogo/Orelope/Irepo.

Fourth Republic

The 4th & 5th Parliament (1999 - 2007)

The 6th Assembly 2007 - 2011

*Omotayo Paul Oyetunji, who was elected on 26 January 2008 in a bye election, replaced Segun Moses Oladimeji who was assassinated on 14 September 2007.

The 7th Assembly 2011 - 2015

8th Assembly (2015-2019)

9th Assembly (2019-date)

References

External links 

National Assembly, Federal Republic of Nigeria
 Senator List

Oyo State politicians
National Assembly (Nigeria) delegations by state